William McCormack was Premier of Queensland.

William McCormack is also the name of:

 William J. McCormack (1933–2016), Chief of Police of the Metro Toronto Police
 William Jerome McCormack (1924–2013), American Prelate of Roman Catholic Church
 William J. McCormack (businessman) (1890–1965), New York City businessman
 William McCormack (cricketer) (1877–1946), Australian cricketer
 John William McCormack (1891–1980), Speaker of the United States House of Representatives

See also 
 Will McCormack (born 1974), American television and film actor
 Billy McCormack (disambiguation)
 
 William McCormick (disambiguation)